Wadesboro or Waidsboro is an unincorporated community in Calloway County, Kentucky, United States.

History
The first settlement in Calloway County was likely made near Wadesboro in 1818. Wadesboro served as the first county seat.

References

Unincorporated communities in Calloway County, Kentucky
Unincorporated communities in Kentucky